Rayford Jerald Coates (May 8, 1924 – July 3, 2013) was a professional American football player. He played two seasons in the National Football League (NFL) as a halfback for the New York Giants.  He attended Louisiana State University, where he played college football for the LSU Tigers football team. He was MVP of the 1947 Cotton Bowl. He was also a member of LSU’s 1946 SEC championship baseball team.  For five decades he held the LSU record for longest punt, at 76-yards against Rice in 1944.

He scored four touchdowns in his professional career: three rushing in 1948 and one receiving in 1949. He also threw a touchdown pass in 1948, and recorded an interception and four fumble recoveries on defense in 1949.

References

1924 births
2013 deaths
Players of American football from New Orleans
New York Giants players
LSU Tigers football players
American football halfbacks